The Redekop School of Business is a business program at Canadian Mennonite University. It was launched on October 19, 2011. The school was made possible through a donation from the Redekop family of British Columbia.

The Redekop School of Business offers a 4-year and 5-year Bachelor of Business Administration, with majors in accounting, business management, human resources management, and not-for-profit management. The school also has a 3-year and 4-year Bachelor of Arts degree program, with a major offered in business and organizational administration. It also offer a Masters in Business Administration.

The Redekop School of Business provides an optional business co-op program. The school has a term of study in an international setting, to prepare students for a global business environment.

References

Business schools in Canada